Inayathalam ( Website) is an Indian Tamil-language crime film, written and directed by newcomer director duo Shankar-Suresh. The film features Ganesh Venkatraman, Shweta Menon, Erode Mahesh and Sukanya in the lead roles, with Delhi Ganesh and Y. G. Mahendra in supporting roles. Featuring music composed by Arrol Corelli, Inayathalam was released on 19 May 2017 to negative reviews.

It's a copy of a Hollywood movie Untraceable, the film involves a serial killer who rigs contraptions that kill his victims based on the number of hits received by a website that features a live streaming video of the victim. Millions of people log on, hastening the victims' deaths.

Cast

 Ganesh Venkatraman as Ganesh
 Y. G. Mahendra as I.G. Sabapathy
 Delhi Ganesh as Panjabikesan
 Erode Mahesh as Ganapathy
 Sukanya as Chandrika
 Shweta Menon as Helen
 G. Koushika
 Adams as News reporter Naveen
 Mohana as Naveen's girl friend
 Ishwarya
 Baby Chetana as Steffi
 Gautham Kurup
 Nippu Samy
 Kovai Ramesh
 Malaysia Rajendran
 Thani Oruvan Jack
 Nithin
 M. Dinesh
 Ragav Mahesh
 Sandeep
 Rudel
 Karthick Raja

Production
Shankar and Suresh, a charted accountant and a doctor, respectively, joined to direct their first feature film Inayathalam, a movie on cyber crime. Ganesh Venkatraman and Shweta Menon were signed to play the lead roles of investigation officers. The film began its shoot in August 2016 for two days, before resuming shoot in September. Portions of the film were shot in Kari Motor Speedway, Chettipalayam before the team moved to Coimbatore in October 2016.

Review 
Though Shankar-Suresh have won in story selection and roping in the cast and the crew, they have missed out on presenting the film in a racy manner. But still, Inayathalam impresses in parts.worst cast selection. Even the lead actors fails to impress. Lot of flaws. Its always difficult to make a movie. But please use it wisely.

References

External links
 

2017 films
Films about computing
2010s Tamil-language films
Indian remakes of American films
Indian crime drama films
2017 directorial debut films